Athiya Shetty (born 5 November 1992) is an Indian actress. The daughter of actor Suniel Shetty, she has played the leading lady in the Hindi films Hero (2015), Mubarakan (2017), and Motichoor Chaknachoor (2019).

Early life 
Shetty was born on 5 November 1992 to actor Suniel Shetty and director Mana Shetty in Bombay (now Mumbai). While her father hails from the Tulu-speaking Bunt community, her mother was born to Punjabi Hindu mother and a Gujarati Muslim father. She has a younger brother, Ahan Shetty, who also became an actor after debuting in the film Tadap (2021).

Shetty studied at the Cathedral and John Connon School and later shifted to the American School of Bombay. While there, she participated in school plays alongside Shraddha Kapoor and Tiger Shroff. She relocated to New York City to enroll at the New York Film Academy, as she wanted to act in films.

Career 

Shetty made her acting debut in 2015 with the Nikhil Advani-directed romantic action film Hero, a remake of co-producer Subhash Ghai's 1983 classic of the same name. She portrayed the role of Mumbai-based aspiring dancer Radha Mathur, who falls in love with her kidnapper Sooraj (Sooraj Pancholi), a gangster trying to extort her police chief father, IG Shrikant Mathur. For her portrayal of Radha, she received Filmfare award nomination for the Best Female Debut. Bollywood Hungama, a leading website of India, wrote that ″Shetty needs some more time to improve her acting skills″. After her debut, she became the brand ambassador for the Indian franchise of  Maybelline New York and featured in the Indian edition of high-profile magazine covers such as Cosmopolitan, Verve, Harper's Bazaar and many more.

After a brief period of 2 years, Shetty appeared in Anees Bazmee's romantic comedy Mubarakan opposite Anil Kapoor, Arjun Kapoor and Ileana D'Cruz. The film, shot in Punjab and London, was a box office hit, though perceived to be a failure, and earned 93.59 crores. In the film, she played the role of a simple Punjabi girl named Binkle Sandhu who falls in love with Charan (Arjun Kapoor) but her wedding is instead fixed with Charan's twin brother Karan, who wants to marry his love interest Sweety (D'Cruz). Shetty received positive to mixed reviews for her performance in the film, though the film received mixed to negative reviews. She then appeared in a song, "Tere Naal Nachna", in 2018, composed, written and sung by Badshah, and featuring newbie singer Sunanda Sharma, for the film Nawabzaade, produced by Remo D'Souza and directed by choreographer Jayesh Pradhan, starring Raghav Juyal, Dharmesh Yelande and Punit Pathak.

Later on, in 2019, Shetty was cast as Anita "Ani" Awasthi, a young woman who is desperate to settle abroad by marrying an NRI, in Debamitra Biswal's comedy drama Motichoor Chaknachoor, opposite Nawazuddin Siddiqui. The film opened to mixed reviews.

Shetty is next committed to appear in footballer Afshan Ashiq's biopic film, Hope Solo, where she will be seen playing the title role.

Personal life 
Shetty married her long time partner, Indian cricketer KL Rahul on 23 January 2023.

Filmography

Films

Awards and nominations

References

External links
 
 
 

1992 births
Living people
Actresses from Mumbai
Indian film actresses
Actresses in Hindi cinema
Tulu people
Gujarati people
Punjabi people
International Indian Film Academy Awards winners
New York Film Academy alumni
21st-century Indian actresses